Álvaro Aguirre Arévalo (born 3 February 2000) is a Spanish professional footballer who plays as a winger for Rayo Vallecano B.

Club career
Born in Madrid, Aguirre joined Rayo Vallecano's youth setup in 2014, from Alcobendas CF. He made his senior debut with the reserves on 27 April 2019, coming on as a second-half substitute in a 1–1 Tercera División away draw against RSD Alcalá.

Aguirre scored his first senior goal on 21 March 2021, netting the B's second in a 5–1 away routing of CF Pozuelo de Alarcón. On 27 July, he renewed his contract for a further year.

Aguirre made his first team – and La Liga – debut on 2 January 2022, replacing Sergi Guardiola late into a 0–2 away loss against Atlético Madrid.

References

External links
 FutMadrid profile 
 
 
 

2000 births
Living people
Footballers from Madrid
Spanish footballers
Association football wingers
La Liga players
Tercera Federación players
Rayo Vallecano B players
Rayo Vallecano players